Marie Antoinette: Original Motion Picture Soundtrack is the soundtrack album to the 2006 historical drama film Marie Antoinette. It was released on October 10, 2006, by Verve Forecast Records and Polydor Records. The soundtrack is composed heavily of atmospheric guitar-based rock music and electronic music, a trend established in previous Coppola films such as Lost in Translation and The Virgin Suicides, which were also produced by music director Brian Reitzell.

While the film itself is set in 18th-century France, the bulk of the soundtrack consists of 1980s new wave and post-punk artists such as Siouxsie and the Banshees, New Order, The Cure, and Bow Wow Wow. The soundtrack also contains several period baroque pieces, including works by Antonio Vivaldi, Jean-Philippe Rameau, and Domenico Scarlatti.

The limited-edition vinyl version has album art by Elizabeth Peyton. Roger Neill served as a historic music consultant on the film.

Reception
The album debuted at number 154 on the US Billboard 200. In its second week, it jumped to number 97.

It was nominated for "Best Soundtrack" at the Broadcast Film Critics Association Awards.

In 2013, the album was named as one of "The 20 Soundtracks That Defined the 2000s" by Empire magazine.

Track listing

Charts

References

2006 soundtrack albums
Albums produced by Brian Reitzell
Drama film soundtracks
New wave soundtracks
Polydor Records soundtracks
Verve Records soundtracks
Works about Marie Antoinette